Lee Sheppard may refer to:
Lee Sheppard (cartoonist), Australian cartoonist and animator
Lee Sheppard (columnist), American tax commentator and columnist for Tax Notes

See also
Lee Shepherd, racing driver